Premna barbata is a plant species in the genus Premna (family Lamiaceae), first described in 1847. It is native to Myanmar and to the Indian Subcontinent.

References 

barbata
Flora of Myanmar
Flora of the Indian subcontinent
Plants described in 1847